County Route 569 (CR 569) is a county highway in the U.S. state of New Jersey. The highway extends  from Quakerbridge Road (CR 533) in Lawrence Township to Broad Street (CR 518) in Hopewell Borough.

Route description

CR 569 begins at an intersection with CR 533 in Lawrence Township, heading to the west on Province Line Road, which quickly narrows from a divided highway into a two-lane undivided road. Passing through a residential neighborhood, the road turns northwest as it crosses the Delaware and Raritan Canal and comes into wooded areas with some homes. CR 569 reaches the CR 583 intersection, turning southwest onto that route before splitting and heading north on Fackler Road. Along this road, the route passes homes and farms before coming to a brief concurrency with US 206. Past US 206, CR 569 continues north on Carter Road and passes through mostly residential areas with some farms and corporate parks. The road intersects CR 604 before coming into Hopewell Township and meeting CR 625. From this point, the road continues north, with the surroundings becoming more rural as it comes into Hopewell Borough, where CR 569 becomes municipally-maintained Princeton Avenue. The route passes homes before reaching its northern terminus at an intersection with CR 518.

Major intersections

See also

References

External links

New Jersey 5xx Routes (Dan Moraseski)

569
569